Cataldo (Aldo) Miccio (born 1971)  is a New Zealand former local-body politician.  He was the Mayor of Nelson for one term from 2010 to 2013.

Background 
Miccio is married to Kimberley, a former Sydney hotel reservations sales manager, and has three children. He was born in Nelson in 1971, lived in Tāhunanui, is a second generation Nelsonian, and was educated at St Joseph's primary school and Nelson College. He graduated from the University of Canterbury with a Bachelor of Commerce Degree (marketing and management). His parents are Nelson-born Cristina Romano and Italian-born Raffaele Miccio, a fish and chip shop owner, restaurateur and market gardener. His maternal grandfather, Cataldo Romano, migrated to Nelson from Massa Lubrence, Italy in the 1920s. Massa Lubrence is the same place where Miccio's father was born.

Miccio speaks the Naples dialect.

In 2016 Miccio relocated to the Central Coast in Sydney, Australia with his family.

Career 
In 1993 Miccio was chief representative officer in China for a multinational textile company. and in 1994 became in inaugural member of the New Zealand Shanghai business forum.

Miccio moved to Australia and in 1995 became General Manager of the clothing division an Australian giftware company. In 1998 he began his own clothing and giftware company, Bissi, which now has offices in Sydney, Melbourne, Hong Kong and Xiamen, China. In 2009 he sold Bissi to a Chinese company, but remains a Director. He met and married his wife while working in Australia.

He is also a Director of AAPI Limited, and his cousin Anthony Romano is the other Director of the company.

Miccio is beneficiary of the April Trust.

Miccio was a trustee of the Summit Nelson Tasman Rescue Helicopter until 2016, a founding member of the Nelson Bays Community Foundation, (Nelson's first community endowments trust), Trustee and Deputy Chair of Nelson Tasman Hospice.

From August 2012 – July 2014 Miccio was Chairman and Co-Director of NZ Inc Shop, an entity offering exporters of New Zealand-made products the opportunity to sell their goods to China.

Miccio is a Director of Trafalgar Events, formed in 2016, the entity responsible for bringing the first NRL trial match to Nelson's Trafalgar Park, between New Zealand Vodafone Warriors and St George Illawarra Dragons. Following this event, the entity hosted the first A league football match in Nelson, the Wellington Phoenix versus the Central Coast Mariners. Trafalgar Events was also behind a new Nelson festival, SNAPAFEST, combining seafood, music and arts, with the inaugural event taking place in September 2016.

He was appointed General Manager at Cooper Watkinson Textiles in October 2014, and in 2017 became Managing Director at Kela Charms Pty Ltd.

In 2005 Miccio was winner of Papal award for outstanding contributions to product development and international distribution.

Political career 
Miccio returned to Nelson in 2002 and became a Nelson City Councillor in 2007 (serving one term) and was elected mayor in 2010 at the age of 39. He was defeated by Rachel Reese at the next election in 2013.

Contribution to the 2011 Rugby World Cup 
Whilst serving as a Nelson City Councillor Miccio was instrumental in securing three Rugby World Cup 2011 matches for the city and did much of the groundwork to ensure the Italian Rugby World Cup team were hosted in Nelson during the event. His success was underpinned by a mention in Martin Snedden's book, A Stadium of 4 Million. During this time he was also the first non-Māori  to speak at a Pōwhiri at the Whakatū Marae, welcoming the Italian Rugby World Cup team in their native Italian.

During Rugby World Cup 2011, Miccio launched Hug an Aussie Day to coincide with the Australian RWC team's arrival in Nelson. The initiative was a response to a perceived atmosphere of antipathy towards Australians brought on by the tournament. The initiative was a huge PR success bringing international TV coverage to the small New Zealand city of Nelson.

Contribution to National League Football in Nelson 
During his time as Nelson's mayor, Miccio was part of the consortium who brought National League Football to Nelson. As the Nelson Falcons Founder and Club Chairman, Miccio helped propel the team to take part in a national final in their second season, having won eight games in a row. In the early 2014 season they were beaten finalists, in the late 2014 season they were champions.

A keen sportsman, Miccio also took part in the charity boxing match, Fight for Victory, whilst he was mayor, and provided a personal grant to help facilitate educational opportunities for promising children at Victory Boxing in Nelson.

Under Miccio's leadership, Nelson City Council achieved much economic success and regional growth, including the following achievements:
 Developed and consulted with the public on the Framing our Future Vision for Nelson 2060
 Brought cruise ships back to Nelson
 Hosted the Iwi Economic Development Summit
 Successfully implemented free parking Tuesdays
 Helped to facilitate the ultra fast broadband roll out
 Gifted land to help Nelson Housing Trust proceed with an affordable housing development at the Brook
 Completed purchase of Theatre Royal and Nelson School of Music
 Completed 2013 Trafalgar Park upgrade
 Approved funding for Trafalgar Centre
 Built the Saxton Field hockey and cricket pavilions and approved the proposed cycle velodrome
 Helped fund Kiwiflyer movie production costs
 Developed economic development opportunities with sister city, Huangshi
 Signed a new sister city Memorandum of Understanding to explore economic opportunities with Yangjiang
 Approved and began work on the Maitai Dam duplicate pipeline to Nelson city significantly increasing water security and the water volume that can be used from the dam
 Successfully bid for the rights to host at least two pool matches at the ICC Cricket World Cup in February 2015.
 Launched The Solar Promise, a nationwide campaign encouraging all NZ councils to embrace solar solutions and make it easier for their communities to go solar.
 Developed a proposal to set up contact centres in Nelson providing new job opportunities.
During his three-year term as mayor and under Miccio's prudent financial management, there was an average rates rise of just 3.6%, the lowest of any term in the preceding 20 years. Nelson City Council debt rate was in the bottom 20% of all councils throughout New Zealand.

During Miccio's term as mayor, following some controversy around how the relationship between the work of mayor and his private business interests had been managed, Miccio requested that the Office of the Auditor-General conduct an independent review. The OAG concluded that they were satisfied Miccio did not pursue any private business interests during his Council funded travel to China in 2012.

Film 
Miccio made a cameo appearance in the film Kiwi Flyer.

References 

1970s births
Living people
Mayors of Nelson, New Zealand
People educated at Nelson College
New Zealand people of Italian descent
University of Canterbury alumni
New Zealand businesspeople